TSBC is an abbreviation that may refer to:

 Tiffin School Boat Club, the rowing club of Tiffin School, Kingston upon Thames, England
 Transportation Safety Board of Canada
 The Sperm Bank of California